General elections were held in Djibouti on 24 April 1987 to elect a President and National Assembly. At the time, the country was a one-party state with the People's Rally for Progress (RPP) as the only legally permitted party. In the presidential election, incumbent president Hassan Gouled Aptidon was the only candidate for the presidency, and was re-elected unopposed. In the National Assembly elections, voters were presented with a single list of 65 RPP candidates. They could only vote against by casting a blank vote or abstaining. The list was approved by 87% of registered voters. Voter turnout for the National Assembly vote was slightly lower at 88.69%.

Results

President

National Assembly

References

Djibouti
General
Elections in Djibouti
One-party elections
Single-candidate elections
Presidential elections in Djibouti
Djibouti